Ruda is a comune (municipality) in the Province of Udine in the Italian region Friuli-Venezia Giulia, located about  northwest of Trieste and about  southeast of Udine.

Ruda borders the following municipalities: Aiello del Friuli, Campolongo al Torre, Cervignano del Friuli, Fiumicello Villa Vicentina, San Pier d'Isonzo, Turriaco, Villesse.

Ruda was the birthplace of footballer Tarcisio Burgnich.

References

External links

 Official website